The Thetford to Bury St Edmunds line is a closed railway between Thetford in Norfolk and Bury St Edmunds in Suffolk, England.

History

Opening
The line was built and opened by the Bury St Edmunds and Thetford Railway (B&TR)  on 1 March 1876 and was bought by the Great Eastern Railway (GER) two years later.

Train services
The line typically had four return passenger services and one freight working a day.

Closure
It closed to passengers on 8 June 1953 and goods traffic on 27 June 1960.

Sources

Closed railway lines in the East of England
Rail transport in Suffolk
Rail transport in Norfolk
Railway lines opened in 1876